The Saratov Aviation Plant (Saratovskiy Aviatsionnyy Zavod, SAZ, Саратовский Авиационный Завод, САЗ) was a Russian/Soviet aircraft production facility, located in Saratov, Russia.

Aviation Plant №292 of MAP (Ministry of Aviation Industry of the USSR), former plant of combine harvesters, aircraft production since 1925, converted to "aviation" in 1937. The plant had 15,000 employees in 1992. The company was declared bankrupt in February 2011.

Production
 R-10/KhAI-5, 1938..1940, 135.
 Yak trainers
 Yak-1, 1128 units in 1944.
 Yak-3, 1944 (1682 units)
 Yak-18T
 Yak-25
 Yak-27
 Yak-38
 Yak-40
 Yak-42
 Yak-54
 La-11
 La-15
 MiG-15
 EKIP Tarielka (Ekologiya i Progres or Ecology & Progress, an experimental saucer-shaped craft)

References

External links
 aviation.ru/facility/#292
 yak40.com/saratov
 yak42.com/bureau

Defunct aircraft manufacturers of Russia
Aircraft manufacturers of the Soviet Union
Companies based in Saratov
Vehicle manufacturing companies disestablished in 2011